The Fantasy Film Worlds of George Pal is a 1985 American documentary film about Academy Award-winning producer/director George Pal. It was written, directed, and produced by Arnold Leibovit.

Summary
The film follows Pal's career, beginning with his early life in Hungary and Germany, and covering his progression from cartoon artist to creator of stop-motion animated short films (known as Puppetoons) to full-length feature motion pictures. Pal was a visionary and innovator in the world of motion pictures, especially in the area of stop motion animation, which he pioneered. His work earned him eight Academy Awards and served as an inspiration for Gene Roddenberry, Steven Spielberg and George Lucas, among others. The film includes interviews with Pal's cast members, crew, and peers, as well as Pal himself.

Release
The film premiered at the Academy of Motion Pictures Arts and Sciences as part of the annual "George Pal Lecture on Fantasy in Film". It was also released on DVD on August 29, 2000.

Cast

 Robert Bloch
 Chesley Bonestell
 Ray Bradbury
 Wah Chang
 Tony Curtis
 Jim Danforth
 Joe Dante
 Roy Edward Disney
 Barbara Eden
 Paul Frees (Narrator of the Film)
 Duke Goldstone
 Gae Griffith
 Ray Harryhausen
 Charlton Heston
 Walter Lantz
 Janet Leigh
 Albert Nozaki
 David Pal
 Tony Randall
 Ann Robinson
 Gene Roddenberry
 Russ Tamblyn
 Rod Taylor
 William Tuttle
 Gene Warren
 Robert Wise
 Alan Young
 Ward Kimball
 Yvette Mimieux
 George Pal

References

External links
 
 
 
 Arnold Leibovit on THE FANTASY FILM WORLDS OF GEORGE PAL

1985 films
1985 documentary films
American documentary films
Documentary films about film directors and producers
Documentary films about animation
Films directed by Arnold Leibovit
1980s English-language films
1980s American films